This is a list of General Motors factories that are being or have been used to produce automobiles and automobile components. The factories are occasionally idled for re-tooling.

Current factories

Sold/co-operated factories

Former factories

See also
Flint, Michigan auto industry
List of former automotive manufacturing facilities
List of Ford factories
List of Chrysler factories
History of General Motors

References

General Motors factories

Opel